was a town located in Maniwa District, Okayama Prefecture, Japan.

As of 2003, the village had an estimated population of 2,372 and a density of 30.43 persons per km2. The total area was 77.94 km2.

On March 31, 2005, Kawakami, along with the town of Hokubō (from Jōbō District), and towns of Katsuyama, Kuse, Ochiai and Yubara, and the villages of Chūka, Mikamo and Yatsuka (all from Maniwa District) were merged to create the city of Maniwa.

Geography
Mountains: 
Rivers: Asahi River (The big-3 river through Okayama Prefecture)

Adjoining municipalities
Okayama Prefecture
Yubara
Yatsuka
Shinjō
Tottori Prefecture
Kōfu
Kurayoshi (Former Sekigane town)

Education
Kawakami Elementary School
Hiruzen Junior High School (Yatsuka)

Transportation 
Expressways:
Yonago Expressway
Hiruzen Kōgen Service Area - Hiruzen Interchange
National highways:
Route 482
Prefectural roads:
Okayama Prefectural Route 58 (Hokubō - Kawakami)
Okayama Prefectural Route 113 (Kamitokuyama-Matano-Kōfu)
Okayama Prefectural Route 114 (Daisen-Kamifukuda)
Okayama Prefectural Route 322 (Nakafukuda-Yubara)
Okayama Prefectural Route 324 (Higashikayabe-Shimofukuda)
Okayama Prefectural Route 422 (Hiruzen Kōgen)
Okayama Prefectural Route 702 (Yatsuka-Kawakami cycling road)
Roadside Station

Notable places and events
Mount Hiruzen

Hiruzen Kōgen Center / Joyful Park (Amusement park)
Hiruzen Bear Valley Ski resort

External links
Official website of Maniwa in Japanese

Dissolved municipalities of Okayama Prefecture
Maniwa